The commune of Makebuko is a commune of Gitega Province in central Burundi. The capital lies at Makebuko.

References

Communes of Burundi
Gitega Province